Marco Bode (born 23 July 1969) is a German former professional footballer. A one club man, Bode spent his entire professional career at Werder Bremen. He played as a left winger and forward.

Club career
Bode played his first football with home club VfR Osterode, before moving to the amateur team of Werder Bremen in 1988. He was discovered by Otto Rehhagel and soon moved to the professional team.

Between 1989 and 2002 he was active in 379 games for Werder, in which he scored 101 goals, making him the then-record Bremen goal-scorer. He has since been overtaken by fellow Werder Bremen legend Claudio Pizarro. Despite some offers by major European clubs such as Bayern Munich, he remained loyal to Werder Bremen, retiring somewhat early after the 2002 World Cup. Bode also won renown because he was a particularly fair and decent player who only was booked ten times in his entire Bundesliga career and never got sent off. He was also known for his smart, sundry TV interviews. The 1999–2000 season was his most successful, seeing him score 18 goals for his club and four for Germany.

International career
In the seven years following 1995, Bode also played in 40 games for the Germany national team, scoring nine goals. He took part in the UEFA Euro 1996 final and in the final of the 2002 FIFA World Cup. At the World Cup, Bode was a surprise substitution from manager Rudi Völler in the crucial third group match against Cameroon with the match still at 0–0. Normally a forward, Bode was selected by Völler as an attacking left wing-back in his favoured 3-5-2 formation. Being close to retirement, the German fans felt Bode's selection was dubious, however he silenced the doubters by scoring the opening goal of an eventual 2–0 win for Germany propelling them into the knockout stages as group winners. It would be Bode's final goal and he made his last appearance in the World Cup final as Germany fell to Brazil.

Career statistics

Club

International

Scores and results list Germany's goal tally first, score column indicates score after each Bode goal.

Honours
Werder Bremen
 Bundesliga: 1992–93
 DFB-Pokal: 1990–91, 1993–94, 1998–99
 DFB-Supercup: 1988, 1993, 1994
 UEFA Cup Winners' Cup: 1991–92
 UEFA Super Cup runner-up: 1992
 UEFA Intertoto Cup: 1997–98

Germany
 UEFA European Championship: 1996
 FIFA World Cup runner-up: 2002

Individual
 Werder Bremen's most successful Bundesliga scorer: 2nd with 101 goals
 Werder Bremen's Bundesliga players with most appearances: 4th with 379 appearances
 Werder Bremen's player with most international matches: 4th with 40 caps

References

External links
 

1969 births
Living people
People from the Harz
People from Osterode am Harz
Footballers from Lower Saxony
Association football forwards
Association football wingers
German footballers
Germany international footballers
Germany under-21 international footballers
Bundesliga players
SV Werder Bremen players
SV Werder Bremen II players
UEFA Euro 1996 players
UEFA Euro 2000 players
2002 FIFA World Cup players
UEFA European Championship-winning players
West German footballers